The Hummingbird is a 2022 Italian drama film directed by Francesca Archibugi.

The film is an adaptation of the 2019 novel of the same name by Sandro Veronesi. It premiered at the Rome Film Festival on 13 October 2022. It was theatrically released in Italy the following day.

Cast

References

External links

2022 films
2020s Italian-language films
2022 drama films
Italian drama films
2020s Italian films
Films directed by Francesca Archibugi
Films based on Italian novels
Rai Cinema films
Fandango (Italian company) films